Sussex 1 (known as Harvey's of Sussex 1 due to sponsorship reasons) is an English level 9 Rugby Union League. It is made up of teams predominantly from Sussex. Teams play home and away matches from September through to April.  The league champions are automatically promoted up to London 3 South East, while the second placed team plays a promotion playoff against the second placed team from Kent 1. Relegated teams drop to Sussex 2 although in recent season there has been no relegation.  Only 1st XV sides can be promoted into London 3 South East.

The system from 2017 to 2018 sees the eight team league play home and away games against each team in the league (14 games each) up until February when the league splits into two mini leagues of 4 teams (Sussex 1A and Sussex 1B) based on league ranking.  Each team then a further 6 games against teams in their group (home and away) with the teams in the promotion group (1A) playing off for the title, and the teams in the relegation group (1B) playing to avoid the drop.  Note that points from the first stage are carried into the second.

Each year some of the clubs in this division also take part in the RFU Junior Vase - a level 9-12 national competition.

Teams for 2021-22

The teams competing in 2021-22 achieved their places in the league based on performances in 2019–20, the 'previous season' column in the table below refers to that season not 2020–21.

Barns Greeen finished 9th in 2019-20 and whilst not relegated, did not return for 2021-22 and instead have dropped to Sussex 2 West.

Season 2020–21

On 30 October 2020 the RFU announced  that due to the coronavirus pandemic a decision had been taken to cancel Adult Competitive Leagues (National League 1 and below) for the 2020/21 season meaning Sussex 1 was not contested.

Teams for 2019-20

Teams for 2018-19

Teams for 2017-18

Teams for 2016-17
Bognor 2nd XV (promoted from Sussex Canterbury Jack Division 2)
Brighton II
Burgess Hill (relegated from London 3 South East)
Crawley
Hellingly
Horsham II
Hove 2nd XV 
Seaford
Shoreham (promoted from Sussex Canterbury Jack Division 2) 
Uckfield (relegated from London 3 South East)

Teams for 2015-16
Brighton II
Chichester III
Crowborough II
Crawley
Haywards Heath
Hellingly
Horsham II
Hove 2nd XV
Lewes (relegated from London 3 South East)
Midhurst
Seaford
Worthing Senior I

Teams for 2014-15
Brighton II
Burgess Hill (relegated from London 3 South East)
Chichester III
Crowborough II
Crawley
Eastbourne
Hellingly
Holbrook
Hove 2nd XV
Rye
Seaford
Worthing Senior I

Teams for 2012-13
Brighton II
Burgess Hill
Chichester III
Eastbourne 
Holbrook
Haywards Heath II
Hove III
Lewes II
Midhurst
Newick
Rye
Seaford

Original teams
When league rugby began in 1987 this division contained the following teams:

Bognor
Brighton
Burgess Hill
Chichester
Crowborough
Eastbourne
Hastings & Bexhill
Haywards Heath
Hove
Sussex Police

Sussex 1 honours

Sussex 1 (1987–1993)

The original Sussex 1 was a tier 8 league with promotion up to London 3 South East and relegation down to Sussex 2.

Sussex 1 (1993–1996)

The creation of National 5 South meant that Sussex 1 dropped from a tier 9 league to a tier 10 league for the years that National 5 South was active.  Promotion and relegation continued to London 3 South East and Sussex 2 respectively.

Sussex 1 (1996–2000)

The cancellation of National 5 South at the end of the 1995–96 season meant that Sussex 1 reverted to being a tier 8 league.  Promotion and relegation continued to London 3 South East and Sussex 2 respectively.

Sussex 1 (2000–2009)

The introduction of London 4 South East ahead of the 2000–01 season meant Sussex 1 dropped to become a tier 9 league with promotion to this new division.  Relegation continued to Sussex 2 (briefly two regional divisions) until that league was abolished at the end of the 2003–04 season.

Sussex 1 (2009–present)

Sussex 1 remained a tier 9 league despite national restructuring by the RFU.  Promotion was to London 3 South East (formerly London 4 South East) and relegation was to Sussex Canterbury Jack Intermediate (Sussex 2) which was reintroduced for the 2010–11 season after an absence of six years.

Promotion play-offs
Since the 2000–01 season there has been a play-off between the runners-up of Kent 1 and Sussex 1 for the third and final promotion place to London 3 South East. The team with the superior league record has home advantage in the tie.  At the end of the 2019–20 season the Kent 1 teams have been the most successful with fourteen wins to the Sussex 1 teams five; and the home team has won promotion on eleven occasions compared to the away teams eight.

Number of league titles

Uckfield (5)
Bognor (3)
Crawley (3)
Heathfield & Waldron (3)
Hove (3)
Brighton (2)
Chichester (2)
Eastbourne (2)
Hastings & Bexhill (2)
Pulborough (2)
Burgess Hill (1)
Crowborough (1)
Haywards Heath (1)
Hellingly (1)
Horsham (1)
Lewes (1)

See also
London & SE Division RFU
Sussex RFU
English rugby union system
Rugby union in England

Notes

References

External links
Sussex Rugby Football Union

9
Rugby union in Sussex